Pic de Madrès is a peak in the French Pyrenees, in the Aude department,  Languedoc-Roussillon. It has an elevation of 2,469 m.

Mountains of the Pyrenees